Queen Bess Island Wildlife Refuge is located on Queen Bess Island in the southern portion of Barataria Bay, Jefferson Parish, Louisiana. The entire island was designated a refuge in 2019 and a restoration project completed in February 2020.

Fauna
The refuge is a nesting area for Brown Pelicans, American White Pelicans, Great Egrets, Laughing Gulls, Sandwich Terns, Least Terns, American Oystercatchers, Reddish Egrets, Roseate Spoonbills, Snowy Egrets, Tricolored Herons, and Diamondback Terrapins (Malaclemys terrapin).

History
Brown pelicans stopped nesting on Queen Bess Island and extirpated from all of Louisiana by 1961 because of DDT. In 1968 a reintroduction program was started and young birds were brought from Florida and released. Queen Bess Island was one of three rookery sites chosen. The island had been severely damaged by repeated storms and only 5 of the 36 acres were able to support nesting.

Location
Queen Bess Island Wildlife Refuge is located on Queen Bess Island, three miles northeast of Grand Isle State Park, on Grand Isle.

Current
In 2019 the Louisiana Wildlife and Fisheries Commission approved a resolution designating the island a state refuge. Through the Deepwater Horizon restoration project, funded by settlement funds, island restoration was completed in February 2020 in time for the nesting season. The refuge is the fourth largest brown pelican colony in the state. The island was only slightly damaged by Tropical Storm Cristobal.

References

External links
Queen Bess Island

Wildlife management areas of Louisiana